Mark Christopher Smith (born October 24, 1977) is a Canadian former professional ice hockey centre who played in the National Hockey League (NHL) with the San Jose Sharks and Calgary Flames.

Playing career
Smith was selected by the San Jose Sharks in the ninth round, 219th overall, in the 1997 NHL Entry Draft.

On July 24, 2006, Smith was awarded a $700,000 one-year contract through arbitration. In September 2007, he was invited for a tryout at the New York Rangers training camp; however, after playing in 2 pre-season games with the club, he was released. Less than a week later, he was signed by the Flames.

His career was ended when he was crushed into the boards by Derek Boogaard and suffered neck injuries on March 22, 2008.

Playing style
Smith was a fast skater with an energetic checking style and scrappy demeanour that sometimes resulted in fights. San Jose had utilized Smith as a penalty killer and powerplay specialist.

In the 2005–06 NHL season Smith displayed some of his offensive ability by setting a career high in regular season and playoff goals.

Off the ice
Smith is the guitarist and lead singer for the Bay Area band, The Vinyl Trees, featured on Smith's own record label Lunar Records. He started Lunar Records during the 2004–05 NHL lockout. Smith, who has been playing guitar since age 16, adds color to his music with a variety of other instruments like the Didgeridoo, the Xylophone, and the Donkey Jaw. He is also known for his constantly changing hair styles.

Smith made his debut as a commentator for Comcast Sports Net Bay Area during the 2009 playoffs. He is a color commentator for select San Jose Sharks games. He and his wife ran a clothing store, Ayla, in downtown Campbell, California, now closed.

Career statistics

Regular season and playoffs

Awards and achievements
 Named to the WHL East Second All-Star Team in 1998

References

External links
 

1977 births
Calgary Flames players
Canadian ice hockey centres
Ice hockey people from Edmonton
Kentucky Thoroughblades players
Lethbridge Hurricanes players
Living people
San Jose Sharks draft picks
San Jose Sharks players
Victoria Salmon Kings players